Raddics was a Statia association football club based in Oranjestad. The clubs best achievement came in 1982 and 1984 when they finished as runners up in the Sint Eustatius League.

References 

Football clubs in Sint Eustatius
1980s disestablishments in the Netherlands Antilles